Rebus or  Appointment in Beirut is a 1969 crime film directed by Nino Zanchin and starring Laurence Harvey and Ann-Margret. An international co-production, it was largely filmed in Venezuela, the UK and Lebanon.

Cast
Laurence Harvey as Jeff Miller
Ann-Margret as Singer
Andrea Bosic
José Calvo as Benson
Luis Dávila
Alberto de Mendoza
Ivan Desny as Guinness
Lisa Halvorsen
Jan Hendriks
Camilla Horn as Evelyn Brown
Luis Morris
Milo Quesada
Marcus Smith as Croupier

Production
It was one of several films Ann-Margret made away from Hollywood around this time.

References

External links

1969 films
1960s crime thriller films
Italian crime thriller films
Argentine crime thriller films
Spanish crime thriller films
West German films
English-language Argentine films
English-language German films
English-language Italian films
English-language Spanish films
Films with screenplays by Sergio Donati
Films produced by Alberto Grimaldi
Films set in Lebanon
Films set in London
Films shot in Lebanon
Films shot in Venezuela
Films shot in the United Kingdom
Films about gambling
1960s English-language films
1960s Argentine films
1960s Italian films
German crime thriller films